The 2021–22 Vijay Hazare Trophy was the twentieth season of the Vijay Hazare Trophy, a List A cricket tournament that was played in India. It was contested by 38 teams, divided into six groups, with six teams in Group B. The tournament was announced by the BCCI on 3 July 2021. Tamil Nadu won Group B to progress to the quarter-finals, with Karnataka finishing in second place to advance to the preliminary quarter-finals.

Points table

Fixtures
Source:

Round 1

Round 2

Round 3

Round 4

Round 5

References

2021 in Indian cricket
Domestic cricket competitions in 2021–22